Just Gets Better with Time is the sixteenth studio album by American R&B/Soul group The Whispers. It was released on April 9, 1987 via SOLAR Records. This album features their highest charting pop single, "Rock Steady," which peaked inside the top 10 at number 7.  The song also reached number 1 on the U.S. R&B chart.
The album had four more singles released into the following year.  Although none of these additional singles brought further pop success, and the first follow-up single, "Special F/X" only reached the UK charts (peaking at #69), the group maintained a strong presence on the R&B charts. The album's title track, "Just Gets Better with Time", reached number 12 and "In The Mood," now a quiet storm radio staple, charted four spots lower at number 16.  The fifth and final single, 1988's "No Pain, No Gain" reached a dismal 74 on the R&B chart, while limping to number 81 in the UK.

Despite the relative failure of the follow-ups to "Rock Steady," the album itself was a strong seller; it charted high in the U.S. (number 22 on the pop charts-their second highest showing there) while reaching number three on R&B.  It is RIAA-certified platinum.

Track listing
"I Want You" (Richard Aguon, Ruben Laxamana, Lee Peters, Larry White) – 5:42
"Special F/X" (Leon Sylvers III, J.M. Sylvers) – 5:10
"Rock Steady" (Babyface, L.A. Reid, Bo Watson, Dwayne Ladd) – 4:49
"No Pain, No Gain" (Kenny Aubrey, Kevin Grady, Leon Sylvers III) – 4:12
"In The Mood" (Babyface, Daryl Simmons) – 4:47
"Just Gets Better with Time" (Gary Taylor) – 4:30
"Love's Calling" (Grady Wilkins) – 4:58
"Give It To Me" (Nicholas Caldwell) – 5:21

Personnel

The Whispers
Wallace "Scotty" Scott: lead & backing vocals
Walter Scott: lead & backing vocals
Marcus Hutson: lead & backing vocals
Nicholas Caldwell: lead & backing vocals, rhythm arrangements
Leaveil Degree: lead & backing vocals

Additional personnel
Babyface: guitars, keyboards
Stanley Jones: guitars
Michael Thompson: guitars
David Grigsby: guitar
Larry White: guitars, keyboards, percussion
Kevin Grady: keyboards, programming, percussion
Grady Wilkins: keyboards, synthesizers, bass, backing vocals
Ruben Laxamana: keyboards, bass synthesizer
Henry Concepcion: synthesizer and grand piano solos
Ron Artist: Prophet 2000 flute solo
Percy Scott: keyboards
Gary Taylor: keyboards, synthesizers, DMX drum programming, backing vocals
Leon Sylvers III: keyboards, bass, percussion, drum programming
Craig Ragland: bass
Melvin Coleman: bass
Kayo: bass
L.A. Reid: drums, percussion
Kirk Perkins: drums, percussion
Gregory Sweet: drum programming
Don Myrick: saxophone
Lee Peters: backing vocals

References

External links
"Just Gets Better with Time" at discogs

1987 albums
SOLAR Records albums
Capitol Records albums
The Whispers albums
Albums produced by L.A. Reid
Albums produced by Babyface (musician)